Adil Güngör (born 1931) is a Turkish wrestler. He competed at the 1956 Summer Olympics and the 1960 Summer Olympics.

References

External links
 

1931 births
Possibly living people
Turkish male sport wrestlers
Olympic wrestlers of Turkey
Wrestlers at the 1956 Summer Olympics
Wrestlers at the 1960 Summer Olympics
Sportspeople from Denizli
20th-century Turkish people